Marionia cabindae is a species of sea slug, a dendronotid nudibranch, a marine gastropod mollusc in the family Tritoniidae.

Distribution
This species was described from West Africa.

References

Tritoniidae
Gastropods described in 1955